"Michael" Ho Hon Keong (born 29 November 1968) is a Macanese racing driver currently competing in the TCR International Series and TCR Asia Series. Having previously competed in the European F3 Open, Formula V6 Asia and Macau Grand Prix amongst others.

Racing career
Ho began his career in 1997 in the Macau Grand Prix, he continued to race at the Macau Grand Prix up until 2010. He also took part in the China Formula Campus Challenge and ELF Formula Campus International series' in 1998. In 1999 he raced in the Asian Formula Renault 2000 Challenge, he also raced there in 2001. In 2005 he had a single start in the Australian Formula 3. For 2006 he raced in the Formula V6 Asia, he finished 8th in the standings. After not racing there in 2007, he returned there 2008 and stayed there for 2009, he finished 9th in 2008 standings and 5th in 2009. In 2010 he switched to the European F3 Open Championship, he only raced a partial season, finishing 19th in the standings. For 2011 he raced in the Racecar Euro Series, before switching to the Asian Formula Renault Challenge for 2012. In 2013 he took part in the Macau Lotus Greater China Race. He switched to the Chinese Racing Cup for 2015 finishing fifth in the championship standings that year. He switched to the TCR Asia Series for 2016, joining the series with Champ Motorsport.

In November 2016 it was announced that he would race in the TCR International Series, driving a Honda Civic TCR for Champ Motorsport.

Racing record

Complete TCR International Series results
(key) (Races in bold indicate pole position) (Races in italics indicate fastest lap)

† Driver did not finish the race, but was classified as he completed over 90% of the race distance.
* Season still in progress.

References

External links
 
 

1968 births
Living people
TCR International Series drivers
TCR Asia Series drivers
Macau racing drivers
Formula V6 Asia drivers
Euroformula Open Championship drivers
Asian Formula Renault Challenge drivers
Australian Formula 3 Championship drivers
Ombra Racing drivers
Team West-Tec drivers
Cram Competition drivers
Double R Racing drivers
Hitech Grand Prix drivers
Manor Motorsport drivers